Hem Chandra Dev Goswami College, established in 1965, is a general degree college situated at Nitaipukhuri, in Sivasagar district, Assam. This college is affiliated with the Dibrugarh University. This college offers bachelor's degree courses in arts.

References

External links

Universities and colleges in Assam
Colleges affiliated to Dibrugarh University
Educational institutions established in 1965
1965 establishments in Assam